The Stonehill Skyhawks football team represents Stonehill College in football. Stonehill is a member of the Northeast Conference (NEC). Prior to 2005, Stonehill's athletics teams were known as the Chieftains.

The Skyhawks play in W.B. Mason Stadium on the campus of Stonehill College in Easton, Massachusetts, which has a seating capacity of 2,400.

History

Classifications
1988–1996: NCAA Division III
1997–2021 NCAA Division II
2022–present: NCAA Division I FCS

Conference memberships
1988: Independent
1989–1996: Eastern Collegiate Football Conference
1997–2000: Eastern Football Conference
2001–2021: Northeast-10 Conference
2022–: Northeast Conference

References

External links
 

 
American football teams established in 1988
1988 establishments in Massachusetts